Nepal Forever is a 2013 documentary comedy by Russian filmmaker Alyona Polunina.

Plot
The film shows two Russian communists from Saint Petersburg who go to Nepal. They want negotiate the reconciliation between Maoists and Marxists.

External links

 Rome Film Festival - Nepal Forever

References 

2013 films
Films directed by Alyona Polunina
Russian documentary films
Russian comedy films
2010s Russian-language films
Communism in Nepal